Selvin may  refer to

Selvin, Indiana, A place in Indiana
Selvin De León, Guatemalan football player
Selvin Laínez, Honduran politician
Selvin Christopher, Indian missile scientist
Selvin González, Salvadoran footballer
Steve Selvin, Professor at UC Berkeley
Selvin Pennant, Guatemalan football player
Selvin Bonifacio Zepeda, Salvadoran football player
Selvin Young, American football player
Ben Selvin, Musician
Joel Selvin, music critic and author
Paul Selvin Award, An award by Writers Guild of America

Selvin Nadar, freedom fighter in Tirunelveli